Pebble Bed may refer to:

Gravel, a type of rock
Pebble-bed reactor, a type of nuclear power plant